Massachusetts House of Representatives' 29th Middlesex district in the United States is one of 160 legislative districts included in the lower house of the Massachusetts General Court. It covers part of Cambridge and part of Watertown in Middlesex County. Since 2021, Steven Owens of the Democratic Party has represented the district.

The current district geographic boundary overlaps with those of the Massachusetts Senate's 2nd Middlesex district and 2nd Suffolk and Middlesex district.

Previous Representatives
 Peter A. Vellucci
 Timothy J. Toomey, Jr.
 Rachel Kaprielian
 Jonathan Hecht

See also
 List of Massachusetts House of Representatives elections
 List of Massachusetts General Courts
 Other Middlesex County districts of the Massachusetts House of Representatives: 1st, 2nd, 3rd, 4th, 5th, 6th, 7th, 8th, 9th, 10th, 11th, 12th, 13th, 14th, 15th, 16th, 17th, 18th, 19th, 20th, 21st, 22nd, 23rd, 24th, 25th, 26th, 27th, 28th, 30th, 31st, 32nd, 33rd, 34th, 35th, 36th, 37th
 List of former districts of the Massachusetts House of Representatives

Images
Portraits of legislators

References

Further reading

External links
 Ballotpedia
  (State House district information based on U.S. Census Bureau's American Community Survey).

House
Government of Middlesex County, Massachusetts